Walmart Soundcheck was a series of musical performances and interviews released exclusively by Walmart, starting in 2006. Each recording consisted of a four-to-six-song set performed live, plus an interview, and was released as a digital album as well as played on televisions inside Walmart retail stores. The debut performances for the series were by rock bands Switchfoot and Yellowcard. Walmart later began a special series called Risers for less established artists.

In 2013, the Now That's What I Call Music! series released a full album of Soundcheck songs titled Now That's What I Call Soundcheck.

Performances

2006

2007

2008

2009

2010

2011

2012

2013

2014

2015

Risers performances

References
86. Alex Young - Walmart Soundcheck Risers: The Next Big Thing YouTube Video on July 15 2009
Walmart brands
Live album series
2006 establishments in the United States